Serositis refers to inflammation of the serous tissues of the body, the tissues lining the lungs (pleura), heart (pericardium), and the inner lining of the abdomen (peritoneum) and organs within. It is commonly found with fat wrapping or creeping fat.

Causes
Serositis is seen in numerous conditions:
Lupus erythematosus (SLE), for which it is one of the criteria,
Rheumatoid arthritis
Familial Mediterranean fever (FMF)
Chronic kidney failure / Uremia
Juvenile idiopathic arthritis
Inflammatory bowel disease (especially Crohn's disease)
Acute appendicitis
Diffuse cutaneous systemic sclerosis

See also
Hyaloserositis

References

External links 

Gross pathology